The eleventh season of Supernatural, an American dark fantasy television series created by Eric Kripke, premiered on The CW on October 7, 2015 and concluded on May 25, 2016. The season consisted of 23 episodes and aired on Wednesdays at 9:00 pm (ET). This is the fourth and final season with Jeremy Carver as showrunner. The season was released on DVD and Blu-ray in region 1 on September 6, 2016. The eleventh season had an average viewership of 1.78 million U.S. viewers. The season follows Sam and Dean who, after killing Death with his own scythe to get rid of the Mark of Cain, releases an all powerful creature called The Darkness, who threatens to destroy everything in existence.

Cast

Starring
 Jared Padalecki as Sam Winchester
 Jensen Ackles as Dean Winchester
 Misha Collins as Castiel / Lucifer
 Mark A. Sheppard as Crowley

Special guest star
 Jim Beaver as Bobby Singer

Special appearance by
 Samantha Smith as Mary Winchester

Guest stars

Episodes

Production
Supernatural was renewed by The CW for an eleventh season on January 11, 2015. Jensen Ackles directed the first-produced episode of the season, titled "The Bad Seed", which was the third-aired episode. Emily Swallow was cast in a recurring role in July 2015, portraying Amara, a femme fatale. The season features a bottle episode, titled "Baby", in which the entire episode takes place inside the Impala. Richard Speight Jr., who has a recurring role on the series as the Archangel Gabriel, directed the eighth episode of the season. In May 2016, it was announced that Jeremy Carver would be leaving the series, and that Robert Singer and Andrew Dabb would take over the role of showrunner for the twelfth season.

Reception
The review aggregator website Rotten Tomatoes gives the 11th season a 90% approval rating based on 10 reviews, with an average score of 7.46/10. The critics consensus reads, "It may not rewrite the Supernatural playbook, but by introducing an enthralling new threat, this season becomes another high-stakes outing for the Winchesters."

Ratings

Notes

References

External links

Supernatural 11
2015 American television seasons
2016 American television seasons